Naeemi is an Arabic surname. Notable people with the surname include:

Abdul Jabbar Naeemi (born 1967), Afghan diplomat and politician
Sarfraz Ahmed Naeemi (1948–2009), Pakistani cleric

Arabic-language surnames